Sirr may refer to:
 Henry Charles Sirr (1807–1872), British lawyer, diplomat and writer
 Henry Charles Sirr (soldier) (1764–1841), Irish soldier, police officer, wine merchant and collector of documents and curios
 Peter Sirr (born 1960), Irish poet
 Sirr Al-Khatim Al-Khalifa (1919–2006), Sudanese politician and ambassador
 Sirr Parker (born 1977), former college and professional football running back
 Sirr, one of the six Lataif-e-sitta or psychospiritual "organs" in Sufi psychology

SIRR may mean:
 Seremban Inner Ring Road, Malaysia
 Southern Illinois River-to-River Conference, a high school athletic conference